= Audiology and hearing health professionals in Nigeria =

== Hearing healthcare professional qualifications ==
Nigeria is a low-income developing country located in Africa. Currently, there is a lack of information regarding audiological and hearing healthcare in Nigeria.

== Current statistics ==
Country	GNI $Int PPP	Pop. (000s)	Auds	Auds/mil. pop.	ENTs	ENTs/mil. pop.	Aud phys	Aud tech	H/A tech	SLT	TOD
Nigeria	1050	124009	N/A	N/A	60	0	1	50	15	N/A	150

GNI $Int PPP: per capita gross national income in international dollars; Pop. (000s): population (000s); Auds: total audiologists; Auds/mil. pop: audiologists per million people; ENTs: total ENT surgeons; ENTs/mil. pop: ENT surgeons per million people; Aud phys: audiological physicians; Aud techs: audiological technicians; SLT: speech-language therapists; TOD: teachers of the deaf
